Sheikh Faisal Bin Qassim Al Thani Museum is a privately owned museum located in the municipality of Al-Shahaniya in Qatar. Encompassing an area of 530,000 m², the three-building museum was opened in 1998 by Sheikh Faisal bin Qassim Al Thani.

Location
The museum is located in Al Samriya, a locality of Al-Shahaniya that is approximately 20 km westward of the capital Doha. It is accessible through Dukhan Road.

History

In 1998, Sheikh Faisal bin Qassim Al Thani opened the museum to the public. The museum, consisting of three buildings, was built over a historic fort in Al Samriya. Sheikh Faisal has stated that his intent was to preserve and promote the cultural heritage of Qatar by housing traditional artifacts and artworks within the museum.

Collections
There are 15 halls in the museum which accommodate a total of over 15,000 artifacts. All of the artifacts in the museum were collected by Sheikh Faisal over a span of 50 years. The artifacts are grouped into four main categories: Islamic art, vehicles, coins and currency, and traditional Qatari artifacts. Objects of each category are housed in separate rooms with distinct themes.

Islamic art
There are eight designated halls displaying Islamic artworks. Included in this category is a hall for Islamic textiles, a hall for Islamic manuscripts, a hall for Islamic paintings and a hall showcasing verses of the Qur'an.

Vehicles

Several types of vehicles from varying periods are displayed in a number of halls. Automobiles dating from 1885 onward are displayed, as well as former automobiles used by government officials. Furthermore, a number of different motorcycles and bicycles are showcased.

Coins and currency
The coins and currency halls put on display ancient currencies, silver and gold coins used during and before the emergence of Islam in the Middle East, and contemporary currencies of several countries.

Qatari heritage
Traditional Qatari artifacts in the museum vary widely in theme, ranging from pearling equipment, dhows, and Bedouin handicraft.

See also
Collecting practices of the Al-Thani Family

References

Bibliography

1998 establishments in Qatar
Museums established in 1998
Museums in Qatar